Rusty Areias (born September 12, 1949) is a former Democratic member of the California State Assembly for the 25th and 28th district.  Areias served in the California State Assembly from 1982 to 1994. He lost bids for the California State Senate in 1996 and 2002.

From 1998 to 2001, he was the Director of the California Department of Parks and Recreation. He is a principal at California Strategies, a public affairs and lobbying firm. Areias and two other employees of California Strategies were fined in 2013 for seeking to influence state government decisions without registering as lobbyists.  In May 2020 Areias  was honored to attend the dedication of the Rusty Areias Community Garden at Martial Cotter Park located in Santa Clara, California.  The Martial Cotter Park was created largely because of Areias' leadership while serving as Director of the California Department of Parks and Recreation.

References

External links
Rusty Areias at California Strategies LLC

1949 births
Living people
California State University, Chico alumni
Democratic Party members of the California State Assembly
Hispanic and Latino American state legislators in California
People from Los Banos, California